Denzil Ralph Evans (9 October 1915 – 20 February 1996) was an English association footballer.

Born in Hungerford, Evans' first club was Yeovil & Petters United. He joined Football League club Bury on amateur terms in 1934, turning professional at the end of the 1934–35 season. After spending the 1936–37 season at Halifax Town, Evans joined Watford, where he would remain for the rest of his career. The Second World War severely hampered Evans' career, but he managed to finish as Watford's top scorer in 1946–47. His playing days were ended the following year, but Evans stayed at the club as a coach until 1952. He died in 1996, aged 80.

References

1915 births
1996 deaths
People from Hungerford
English footballers
English Football League players
Yeovil Town F.C. players
Bury F.C. players
Halifax Town A.F.C. players
Watford F.C. players
Watford F.C. non-playing staff
Association football forwards